Mateusz Sławik  (born November 3, 1980) is a Polish former professional football goalkeeper.

Career

Club
His former clubs were Polonia Warsaw and GKS Katowice.

In February 2011, he signed half year contract with Górnik Zabrze.

References

External links
 

1980 births
Living people
Polish footballers
Association football goalkeepers
Polonia Warsaw players
Górnik Zabrze players
GKS Katowice players
Sportspeople from Katowice